Harry Kenneth Perrott Boam (born 15 October 1990) is a New Zealand cricketer, and the first schoolboy to play for the Wellington Firebirds, Wellington's domestic cricket team in the State Championship. He also represented New Zealand at the Under 19 Cricket World Cup in Malaysia in and in New Zealand's Under 19 tour of England in 2008 where he played in two test matches and five one day games. Captain of the Wellington College 1st XI team he was award of Wellington Sport's Sportsman of the Year award for 2008.

References

External links
CricInfo page
 

Living people
1990 births
New Zealand cricketers
Wellington cricketers
People educated at Wellington College (New Zealand)
English emigrants to New Zealand
People from Birmingham, West Midlands